Umaid Singh    (8 July 1903 – 9 June 1947), also spelled Umed Singh, was Maharaja of Jodhpur from 1918 until his death, He was the Rajput Ruler. 

The second son of Sardar Singh of Jodhpur, he succeeded his elder brother Maharaja Sir  Sumer Singh upon his death in 1918; in 1922 he served as the aide-de-camp to the Prince of Wales (later Edward VIII). Ruling under the regency of his granduncle until 1923, he was then formally invested as Maharaja by Lord Reading. During his reign, Sir Umaid Singh reformed and reorganised the Jodhpur State Forces and the judicial department, introduced a scheme for extending primary education, revised the land revenue settlement and established state pensions and a Provident Fund for state employees. Enjoying a distinguished military career, he died at his estate on Mount Abu on 9 June 1947 after a reign of 29 years, aged but 43. He died from an acute attack of appendicitis while on a tiger hunt.

Honours
Delhi Durbar silver medal-1911
Prince of Wales Visit Medal-1922
Knight Commander of the Royal Victorian Order (KCVO)-1922
Knight Grand Commander of the Order of the Indian Empire (GCIE)-1930
King George V Silver Jubilee Medal-1935
Knight Grand Commander of the Order of the Star of India (GCSI)-1936 (KCSI-1925)
King George VI Coronation Medal-1937
Grand Cross of the Order of the Dragon of Annam-1940
1939-1945 Star-1945
Africa Star-1945
War Medal 1939-1945-1945
India Service Medal-1945
Knight of the Order of St John (KStJ)-1946
Halvad-Dhrangadhra State Rajyabhisek Medal, 1st class-1948 (post-humous)

See also
Rulers of Marwar

1903 births
1947 deaths
Knights Grand Commander of the Order of the Star of India
Knights Grand Commander of the Order of the Indian Empire
Knights Commander of the Royal Victorian Order
Knights of the Order of St John
Air marshals
Umaid
Indian Knights Commander of the Royal Victorian Order